Bárbara Raquel Paz (born 17 October 1974) is a Brazilian  actress, producer, and film director.

Life and career 
Paz graduated from the Macunaíma Theatre School and from the Antunes Centre for Theatre Research (CPT) and is a long-standing member of TAPA, a São Paulo based performing arts group. She has performed in over 25 plays by a wide range of playwrights from Oscar Wilde to Tennessee Williams. In 2013, in recognition of her distinguished acting career, the Ministry of Culture awarded her the Medalha Cavaleiro (Knight's Medal). Paz is also under permanent contract to TV Globo and has played in many of their soap operas and mini-series. She is the presenter of the Canal Brasil programme A Arte do Encontro (The Art of the Interview) in which she converses with  well-known  figures in Brazilian culture. She has performed in various feature length and short films, including Hector Babenco’s final film My Hindu Friend in which she played opposite Willem Dafoe. She has also ventured into the area of shorts, producing and directing television programmes and other films. The documentary Babenco - Tell Me When I Die is her first feature-length  film. Its première was at the Venice Film Festival 2019 where it won Best Documentary in the official Venice Classics competition, and also the Independent Critics Prize - Bisato D'oro.

The film also received Brazil’s Official Selection for Best International Feature for the 2020 Oscars®️

Filmography

Television

Film

Stage

Awards and nominations

References

External links
 

Living people
1974 births
Brazilian female models
Brazilian film actresses
Brazilian stage actresses
Brazilian television actresses
Reality show winners
Actresses from Rio Grande do Sul
Non-binary models
21st-century LGBT people
Brazilian non-binary actors